Jamiu Damilare Tajudeen (born 25 October 1995) known professionally as Jamopyper, is a Nigerian Afrobeat singer and songwriter Jamopyper signed a record deal with Zlatan ibile "Zanku Records in 2020.  he was nominated for Rookie of Year at The Headies 2020.

Early life and education 
Jamiu Damilare Tajudeen was born on 25 October 1995 in Lagos Egbeda, Nigeria. originally from Iganna, Oyo State, Nigeria. He had his primary education at Topaz Emerald School, Egbeda, and secondary level at Millennium Secondary School, Egbeda.

Musical career 
Jamopyper grew up with the forethought of becoming a mechanical engineer as a young lad but developed interest in doing music full time from the plaudits he received when he performed at small gatherings at the age of 12, which influenced his decision to chase a career in music professionally in 2005, with the likes of Akon, Rihanna, Wizkid, Davido and 9ice being his main inspiration.

His single release Omode Meta featuring Zlatan and Naira Marley, spotlighted him in 2018 followed by another single "Josi" featuring Zlatan and Chinko Ekun gaining him more popularity in the Nigerian Music Space.

His career began to pick up steam with the release of the song "Of Lala" which topped music video charts in nigeria for weeks and culminated with the release of the hit single "iF No Be You " ft Mayorkun. In an interview with Vanguard Nigeria he said "I am excited about the dimension my musical career has taken. I have a lot of songs coming out and I am with my team and what they have lined up for me. The competition may be rife but I am only concentrating on getting better and making good music".

His career hit another milestone when he was signed to Zanku Records Owned By Zlatan In 2019. He has also been featured on several tracks.

In 2020, Jamopyper was nominated by the famous headies awards as rookie of the year alongside Omah lay, Laycon, and Tems

Discography

Singles

As a featured artist

Awards and nominations

References

External links 
Official Youtube 

1995 births
21st-century Nigerian male singers
Yoruba-language singers
Living people
Nigerian People's Party politicians